Nor Astghaberd is a village in the Kajaran Municipality of the Syunik Province in Armenia.

Demographics 
The population of the village was 93 as of 2010, down from 179 at the 2001 census. The village of Nor Astghaberd's population was 57 at the 2011 census, up from 53 at the 2001 census.

References 

Populated places in Syunik Province